Carla Paolina Gallo (born 1975) is an American actress. Gallo has had recurring roles in the television series Undeclared, Carnivàle, Bones, Californication, and a number of film roles. Since her role on Undeclared, she has made frequent appearances in other Judd Apatow productions.

She graduated from Cornell University with a degree in Theater. Her best friend since childhood is Sarah Paulson.

Personal life
Gallo announced she was six months pregnant with her first child, in April 2014, at the L.A premiere of Neighbors. She gave birth to a daughter in the summer of 2014. She gave birth to her second daughter in May 2017. Her husband is screenwriter Mark Satterthwaite.

Filmography

Film

Television

Video games

References

External links
 

Actresses from New York City
American film actresses
American stage actresses
American television actresses
Cornell University alumni
Living people
People from Brooklyn
20th-century American actresses
21st-century American actresses
American people of German descent
American people of Italian descent
1975 births